Hancock's Bridge (also Hancocks Bridge, without an apostrophe) is an unincorporated community and census-designated place (CDP) located within Lower Alloways Creek Township, in Salem County, New Jersey, United States. As of the 2010 United States Census, the CDP's population was 254. The area is served as United States Postal Service ZIP code 08038.

Geography
According to the United States Census Bureau, Hancocks Bridge had a total area of 0.213 square miles (0.551 km2), including 0.206 square miles (0.533 km2) of land and 0.007 square miles (0.018 km2) of water (3.22%).

Demographics

Census 2010

Historic sites
The Hancock House is a historic structure that was the site of the 1778 Hancock's Bridge massacre. Built in 1734 for Judge William and Sarah Hancock, the house featured a blue glazed brick pattern, which gave the year of construction, 1734, and the initials of the couple for whom it was built, 'W S' for William and Sarah. William died in 1762, and passed the house to his son William, also a judge.

References

Census-designated places in Salem County, New Jersey
Lower Alloways Creek Township, New Jersey